The 1965 Soviet Cup was an association football cup competition of the Soviet Union. The winner of the competition, Spartak Moscow qualified for the continental tournament.

Competition schedule

Preliminary stage

Group 1 (Ukraine)

First round
 [Apr 4] 
 Avangard Kerch                1-2  SKA Kiev 
   [Zolotaryov – Sukovitsyn, Kvasov] 
 AVANGARD Zholtyye Vody        1-0  Kolos Poltava 
   [Y.Cherkasov] 
 CHAIKA Balaklava              1-0  Spartak Sumy 
   [Smirnov] 
 Dnepr Kremenchug              1-2  SPARTAK Mogilyov             [aet] 
   [P.Chekhovskiy 90 – M.Stuckmeister 20, I.Sitnikov 120] 
 Gornyak Krivoi Rog            1-1  Desna Chernigov 
   [V.Plotnikov – Rozhanskiy] 
 KOLHOSPNIK Cherkassy          2-1  Dvina Vitebsk                [aet] 
   [A.Andriyash, R.Avanesov pen – Y.Krivorot] 
 Luchaferul Tiraspol           1-2  SHAKHTYOR Alexandria 
   [F.Izbash – Golikov, Val.Barylo] 
 STROITEL Beltsy               3-2  Dneprovets Dneprodzerzhinsk  [aet] 
   [Zvarysh, Shmelenko pen, Kostinskiy – Kurchaninov, Snitko]

First round replays
 [Apr 5] 
 Gornyak Krivoi Rog            1-2  DESNA Chernigov 
   [Kulik – Tretyakov, Zarudny]

Quarterfinals
 [Apr 14] 
 DESNA Chernigov               4-3  Avangard Zholtyye Vody 
   [Shkolnikov-2, Dziapshipa, Katkov – Bukasov (D) og, Malchenko pen, Pomazan] 
 Kolhospnik Cherkassy          2-3  SPARTAK Mogilyov 
   [A.Andriyash ?, V.Maksimov 70 – M.Stuckmeister 25, N.Nekozyrev 29, ?]  
 SHAKHTYOR Alexandria          1-0  Stroitel Beltsy 
   [A.Tovt] 
 SKA Kiev                      1-0  Chaika Balaklava 
   [Sukovitsyn]

Semifinals
 [Apr 21] 
 DESNA Chernigov               1-0  Shakhtyor Alexandria 
   [Mozgunov] 
 SKA Kiev                      3-0  Spartak Mogilyov 
   [V.Kirsanov-2, I.Slavinskiy]

Final
 [Apr 28] 
 Desna Chernigov               0-0  SKA Kiev

Replay
 [Apr 29] 
 DESNA Chernigov               2-1  SKA Kiev 
   [Rozhanskiy, Zima (S) og – Sukovitsyn]

Group 2 (Ukraine)

First round
 [Apr 4] 
 AVANGARD Ternopol             1-0  Volyn Lutsk                  [aet] 
   [V.Badaikin] 
 AVTOMOBILIST Odessa           1-0  Polesye Zhitomir 
   [Ustinov] 
 BUKOVINA Chernovtsy           3-0  Neman Grodno 
   [V.Olshevskiy-2, V.Alutin] 
 Dunayets Izmail               0-0  Spartak Brest 
 Neftyanik Drogobych           1-2  DINAMO-2 Kiev 
   [B.Rossikhin - ?] 
 SPARTAK Ivano-Frankovsk       1-0  Kolhospnik Rovno 
   [Petrash] 
 Verkhovina Uzhgorod           0-0  Zvezda Kirovograd 
 [Apr 8] 
 SKA Lvov                      3-2  Dinamo Khmelnitskiy 
   [Zukauskas-2, Rudenko – Sarkisov, Belyak]

First round replays
 [Apr 5] 
 DUNAYETS Izmail               2-1  Spartak Brest                [aet] 
   [P.Merchanskiy, A.Shevchenko – Zhimerikin] 
 Verkhovina Uzhgorod           w/o  ZVEZDA Kirovograd 
   [Verkhovina substituted 2 field players in the first match]

Quarterfinals
 [Apr 14] 
 AVANGARD Ternopol             2-1  SKA Lvov 
   [Yurov, Kotyolkin – Voznyuk] 
 DUNAYETS Izmail               2-1  Avtomobilist Odessa          [aet] 
   [P.Merchanskiy, Y.Babak – L.Roznyuk] 
 Spartak Ivano-Frankovsk       0-2  BUKOVINA Chernovtsy 
   [Heintsch 65, Bronstein 70] 
 ZVEZDA Kirovograd             1-0  Dinamo-2 Kiev 
   [Y.Panov 30]

Semifinals
 [Apr 21] 
 AVANGARD Ternopol             3-1  Dunayets Izmail 
   [V.Sekech-2, Kotyolkin – V.Sulima] 
 BUKOVINA Chernovtsy           3-1  Zvezda Kirovograd 
   [Bronstein, Novak, Chorba – Y.Panov]

Final
 [Apr 28] 
 Avangard Ternopol             1-1  Bukovina Chernovtsy 
   [Kotyolkin – Voronyuk]

Replay
 [Apr 29] 
 AVANGARD Ternopol             3-0  Bukovina Chernovtsy 
   [Yurov, Maksimov, Serionov]

Group 3 (Ukraine)

Preliminary round
 [Apr 4] 
 Lokomotiv Donetsk             0-1  KHIMIK Severodonetsk         [aet] 
   [Tokarev]

First round
 [Apr 4] 
 Lokomotiv Kherson             0-0  Kommunarets Kommunarsk 
 Shakhtyor Yenakiyevo          w/o  NISTRUL Bendery 
 Spartak Melitopol             2-3  SHAKHTYOR Kadiyevka 
   [V.Kiselyov, Zabudskiy – Smirnov-2, Pugovkin] 
 SUDOSTROITEL Nikolayev        1-0  Shakhtyor Gorlovka 
   [I.Pynzar 87] 
 Tavria Simferopol             0-0  Torpedo Kharkov 
 TRUBNIK Nikopol               4-1  Shakhtyor Torez 
   [A.Lobanov-2, A.Torbin, B.Lesik – Kolesnikov] 
 [Apr 5] 
 SKF Sevastopol                3-0  Avangard Kramatorsk 
   [Yeletskiy-2, Syromyatnikov] 
 [Apr 7] 
 KHIMIK Severodonetsk          1-0  Shakhtyor Krasny Luch 
   [Tokarev]

First round replays
 [Apr 5] 
 LOKOMOTIV Kherson             1-0  Kommunarets Kommunarsk 
   [Chernyshenko] 
 TAVRIA Simferopol             2-0  Torpedo Kharkov 
   [Sukhanov, Kudryashov]

Quarterfinals
 [Apr 14] 
 KHIMIK Severodonetsk          1-0  Shakhtyor Kadiyevka 
   [Denisov] 
 LOKOMOTIV Kherson             1-0  Trubnik Nikopol 
   [Chernyshenko] 
 Sudostroitel Nikolayev        0-1  NISTRUL Bendery  
   [Rybakov] 
 Tavria Simferopol             2-2  SKF Sevastopol 
   [Kotlyarenko, Yarovoi – Litvinov, Aleksandrov]

Quarterfinals replays
 [Apr 15] 
 TAVRIA Simferopol             4-2  SKF Sevastopol 
   [Skripka-2, V.Smirnov, Yarovoi – Nekhanov, Litvinov]

Semifinals
 [Apr 21] 
 Khimik Severodonetsk          0-2  LOKOMOTIV Kherson 
   [Chernyshenko, Levanchenko] 
 TAVRIA Simferopol             3-2  Nistrul Bendery 
   [Yulygin, Mikhokhos, V.Smirnov – Gorbach, Pogrebnoi]

Final
 [Apr 28] 
 LOKOMOTIV Kherson             1-0  Tavria Simferopol 
   [Pshikov]

Final stage

Preliminary round
 [Apr 28] 
 DINAMO Leningrad              1-0  Daugava Riga 
 LOKOMOTIV Tbilisi             1-0  Zarya Lugansk 
   [Koshkelov 88] 
 LOKOMOTIV Vinnitsa            2-1  Energetik Dushanbe 
   [Bosy, Troyanovskiy - ?] 
 MOLDOVA Kishinev              2-1  Terek Grozny                 [aet] 
 SHAKHTYOR Karaganda           3-0  Avangard Kharkov 
   [Y.Yurkevich-2, V.Korolkov] 
 SKA Novosibirsk               2-0  Traktor Volgograd 
 SPARTAK Gomel                 1-0  Dinamo Tallinn 
   [V.Chuyeshkov 80] 
 Stroitel Ashkhabad            0-1  KUBAN Krasnodar 
 Volga Gorkiy                  0-2  ALGA Frunze

First round
 [May 6] 
 ALGA Frunze                   1-0  Trud Voronezh 
 AVANGARD Ternopol             1-0  Žalgiris Vilnius
 DESNA Chernigov               1-0  Shinnik Yaroslavl            [aet] 
 DINAMO Leningrad              6-1  Dnepr Dnepropetrovsk 
   [? – Savelyev] 
 Dinamo Sukhumi                0-0  Metallurg Zaporozhye 
 Kuban Krasnodar               0-3  KAYRAT Alma-Ata 
 LOKOMOTIV Kherson             3-2  Politotdel Tashkent Region   [aet] 
 Lokomotiv Krasnoyarsk         0-1  SKA Novosibirsk 
   [G.Apukhtin] 
 Lokomotiv Tbilisi             1-2  KARPATY Lvov 
 LOKOMOTIV Vinnitsa            1-0  Lokomotiv Chelyabinsk 
   [Sprikut] 
 Neftyanik Fergana             0-0  Spartak Gomel 
 SHAKHTYOR Karaganda           1-0  Ararat Yerevan 
   [V.Korolkov 17] 
 TEKMASH Kostroma              2-0  Moldova Kishinev 
   [Avdeyev, Chesnokov] 
 Trudoviye Rezervy Kursk       0-0  UralMash Sverdlovsk 
 ZNAMYA TRUDA Orekhovo-Zuyevo  2-1  RostSelMash Rostov-na-Donu 
   [? – Levchenko]

First round replays
 [May 7] 
 DINAMO Sukhumi                1-0  Metallurg Zaporozhye         [aet]
 NEFTYANIK Fergana             1-0  Spartak Gomel 
   [Kuramshin] 
 Trudoviye Rezervy Kursk       2-3  URALMASH Sverdlovsk 
   [Basalayev, ? – An.Morozov, V.Kapustin, ?]

Second round
 [May 6] 
 Torpedo Kutaisi               1-3  CSKA Moskva 
   [Igor Janshiyev – Nikolai Kashtanov, Kasimovskiy, Vitaliy Polyakov] 
 [May 11] 
 Alga Frunze                   0-1  KRYLYA SOVETOV Kuibyshev 
   [Anatoliy Kazakov] 
 [May 13] 
 Lokomotiv Kherson             0-1  DINAMO Minsk                 [aet] 
   [Eduard Malofeyev 112] 
 [May 14] 
 KAYRAT Alma-Ata               2-0  Chernomorets Odessa 
   [Anatoliy Chentsov 62, Timur Segizbayev 83] 
 [May 15] 
 Karpaty Lvov                  1-2  SHAKHTYOR Donetsk 
   [B.Keslo 81 – Viktor Zubkov 1 pen, Anatoliy Pilipchuk 67] 
 ZNAMYA TRUDA Orekhovo-Zuyevo  3-2  Pahtakor Tashkent 
   [Polikanov-2, Zakharov – Stanislav Stadnik] 
 [May 16] 
 AVANGARD Ternopol             3-2  SKA Rostov-na-Donu 
   [Shevchuk 30, Kotyolkin 67, 88 – Ricardas Kucinskas 2, Oleg Kopayev 46] 
 Lokomotiv Vinnitsa            0-2  LOKOMOTIV Moskva 
   [Alexandr Manshin 80, Valentin Bubukin 82] 
 SKA Novosibirsk               2-1  Dinamo Kiev 
   [V.Ivanov 33, 59 – Viktor Serebryanikov 32] 
 TEKMASH Kostroma              1-0  SKA Odessa                   [aet] 
   [Jemal Silagadze 101] 
 [May 17] 
 UralMash Sverdlovsk           0-1  SPARTAK Moskva 
   [A.Fedotov (U) 35 og] 
 [May 19] 
 DESNA Chernigov               1-0  Neftyanik Baku 
 Neftyanik Fergana             0-2  DINAMO Moskva 
   [Gennadiy Gusarov 18, Igor Chislenko 33] 
 SHAKHTYOR Karaganda           1-0  Torpedo Moskva 
   [V.Khrapovitskiy 32] 
 [May 22] 
 Dinamo Sukhumi                0-1  DINAMO Tbilisi 
   [Dzidziguri 17] 
 [May 25] 
 DINAMO Leningrad              2-1  Zenit Leningrad 
   [Gennadiy Yevryuzhikhin 2, 80 – Lev Burchalkin 82]

Third round
 [May 27] 
 DINAMO Minsk                  1-0  Shakhtyor Karaganda 
   [Leonard Adamov] 
 [May 29] 
 SHAKHTYOR Donetsk             2-1  SKA Novosibirsk              [aet] 
   [Anatoliy Rodin 95, Stanislav Yevseyenko 97 – Viktor Zubkov (Sh) ? og] 
 [May 30] 
 Tekmash Kostroma              1-3  ZNAMYA TRUDA Orekhovo-Zuyevo 
   [Chesnokov – Rybakov-2, Polikanov] 
 [May 31] 
 KAYRAT Alma-Ata               4-3  Desna Chernigov 
   [Alexandr Abayev, Oleg Maltsev, Sergei Kvochkin, A.Kuklev – Rozhanskiy-3] 
 [Jun 1] 
 Dinamo Moskva                 1-2  DINAMO Leningrad 
   [Georgiy Ryabov 53 – Lavrushchenko 48, Gennadiy Yevryuzhikhin 77] 
 KRYLYA SOVETOV Kuibyshev      2-1  Avangard Ternopol 
   [Anatoliy Kazakov, Anatoliy Zhukov – Yurov] 
 [Jun 2] 
 SPARTAK Moskva                3-2  Lokomotiv Moskva 
   [Yuriy Sevidov 34, 59, Galimzyan Husainov 62 – Vladimir Bystrov 40, Boris Belyakov 65] 
 [Jun 9] 
 CSKA Moskva                   2-4  DINAMO Tbilisi 
   [Boris Kazakov, Boris Sichinava (D) og – Slava Metreveli-2, Ilya Datunashvili, Vladimir Barkaia]

Quarterfinals
 [Jun 9] 
 Shakhtyor Donetsk             0-2  DINAMO Minsk 
   [Mikhail Mustygin 66, 76] 
 SPARTAK Moskva                2-1  Kayrat Alma-Ata 
   [Valeriy Reingold 5, Vladimir Yanishevskiy 19 - Alexandr Abayev 34] 
 [Jun 17] 
 DINAMO Tbilisi                2-1  Znamya Truda Orekhovo-Zuyevo [aet] 
   [Slava Metreveli 23, Vladimir Barkaia 96 – V.Skupov ?] 
 [Jul 4] 
 KRYLYA SOVETOV Kuibyshev      3-1  Dinamo Leningrad 
   [Anatoliy Kazakov 2, Boris Kokh 58, Boris Valkov 61 – Vladimir Voinov 47]

Semifinals
 [Jul 31, Moskva] 
 DINAMO Minsk                  2-1  Dinamo Tbilisi 
   [Yuriy Pogalnikov 6, Leonard Adamov 67 – Vladimir Barkaia 53] 
 [Aug 2] 
 SPARTAK Moskva                4-2  Krylya Sovetov Kuibyshev 
   [Yuriy Sevidov 2 pen, Valeriy Reingold 24, Vladimir Yanishevskiy 32, Galimzyan Husainov 59 – Anatoliy Kazakov 51, Anatoliy Zhukov 70]

Final

Replay

External links
 Complete calendar. helmsoccer.narod.ru
 1965 Soviet Cup. Footballfacts.ru
 1965 Soviet football season. RSSSF

Soviet Cup seasons
Cup
Soviet Cup
Soviet Cup